45th Regiment or 45th Infantry Regiment may refer to:

 45th Rattray's Sikhs, a unit of the British Indian Army
 45th (Leeds Rifles) Royal Tank Regiment, a unit of the British Army 
 45th Light Anti-Aircraft Regiment, Royal Artillery, a unit of the British Army
 45th Garrison Regiment, Royal Artillery, a unit of the British Army
 45th (Nottinghamshire) (Sherwood Foresters) Regiment of Foot, a unit of the British Army 
 45th Cavalry (India), a unit of the Indian Army
 45th Infantry Regiment (Imperial Japanese Army)
 45th Detached Reconnaissance Regiment, a special forces unit of the Russian Army  
 45th Infantry Regiment (United States), a unit of the United States Army

American Civil War regiments

Union Army regiments
 45th Illinois Volunteer Infantry Regiment 
 45th Iowa Volunteer Infantry Regiment 
 45th New York Volunteer Infantry Regiment
 45th Wisconsin Volunteer Infantry Regiment 
 45th Ohio Infantry
 45th Regiment Kentucky Volunteer Mounted Infantry
 45th Regiment Massachusetts Volunteer Infantry
 45th United States Colored Infantry Regiment

Confederate Army regiments
 45th Arkansas Infantry (Mounted)
 45th North Carolina Infantry
 45th Tennessee Infantry Regiment
 45th Virginia Infantry

See also
 45th Division (disambiguation)
 45th Brigade (disambiguation)
 45th Squadron (disambiguation)